Goswin, Bishop of Poznan was a 12th-century Polish Bishop, whose death was reported in the obituary of the Abbey of St. Vincent under the daily date 5 April. His diocese is not known, but it is presumed he was a Bishop of Poznań.
In the catalogue of Bishops of Poznań there is a large gap from 1112AD, when the Bishop was Pavel until 1146AD, when Bogufał is Bishop. 
Goswin could therefore be Bishop between Paul and Bogufał.

References 

Bishops of Poznań
12th-century Roman Catholic bishops in Poland
Year of birth unknown
Date of birth unknown
12th-century deaths